Mara Clara is a Philippine drama television series which aired on ABS-CBN's Primetime Bida block from October 25, 2010, to June 3, 2011 replacing 1DOL and was replaced by Guns and Roses. Directed by Jerome Chavez Pobocan, the series stars Kathryn Bernardo and Julia Montes together with an ensemble cast. It is a remake of the 1992 series of the same name that starred Judy Ann Santos and Gladys Reyes. 

The title is derived from María Clara, the mestiza heroine in Noli Me Tángere, a novel written by José Rizal.

Mara Clara was the highest-rated program of 2011 in Philippine television according to Kantar Media Philippines. The series is streaming online on YouTube.

Series overview

Adaptation

Mara Clara was a remake of the 1992 television series, Mara Clara an adapted novel and serial of Emil Cruz Jr. produced by ABS-CBN. In 1996, the original TV series was adapted into a film where nearly the whole cast reprised their role. In August 2010, ABS-CBN announced that they have decided to remake the television series with Kathryn Bernardo slated for the role of Mara opposite Julia Montes as Clara which centers on two children who were both born on the same day and were switched by Clara's biological uncle, Karlo (Ping Medina). Mara grew up poor while Clara grew up in a rich family as a spoiled girl. However, it was noted that Karlo was only following his brother Gary's (Jhong Hilario) order until both girls were returned to the people they belong to. The series premiered on October 25, 2010, and continued to air until June 3, 2011.

Episodes

Cast

Protagonist 
Kathryn Bernardo as Mara David/Mara Castillo Del Valle  – Mara is the main protagonist. She is the loving and hardworking daughter of Gary and Susan David who will do anything to support her family's needs. Her biological parents are Amanthe and Alvira Del Valle. Her life became miserable when Mara enters the picture to oppose. Despite, all of these misfortunes, she still holds on her faith in God and believes that the sun will shine again for her. She was kidnapped, but survived from being killed by Gary.

Antagonist 
Julia Montes as Clara Castillo Del Valle/Clara David - She is the beautiful and intelligent, but bratty daughter of Amanthe and Alvira Del Valle, a wealthy couple. Her biological parents are Gary and Susan and her friends resent Mara for her social status. She is head-over-heels in love with her childhood best friend Christian.

Lead cast 
Mylene Dizon as Susan David – Mara’s foster mother and Clara’s biological mother. She experiences resentment from Gary and his mother Lupe for not being well-off like Alvira.
Jhong Hilario as Gary David† – Alvira's ex-boyfriend and Lupe's older son. Later it is revealed that he is not the latter's father, and is the biological father of Clara. This is because of his own plans where his brother Karlo had switched the girls at birth. He kidnapped Mara and tried to kill the latter. In the end, he died after Susan impaled him.
Dimples Romana as Alvira Castillo-Del Valle – Clara’s foster mother and Mara’s biological mother. She has always felt the need to spoil Clara throughout her life despite her husband's objections. This went as far as hurting Mara in Clara's defense, before and even after knowing the identities of the girls.
Bobby Andrews as Amanthe Del Valle – Clara's foster father and Mara’s biological father. He does not approve of Clara's mean-spirited personality caused by her spoiled attitude from childhood; thus, he feels distant to her as a foster father. Later revealed to have a mistress in his own company.
Albie Casiño as Christian "Otoy" Torralba – Clara's childhood friend, and eventually Mara's boyfriend. Despite their rough first meeting and impressions, he becomes determined to earn Mara's friendship and trust.
John Manalo as Erris Reyes – Christian's best friend. At first, he prioritizes working over his studies, but eventually enrolls in the same private school as Christian, Clara, and Mara.

Main cast 
Gina Pareño as Lupe David – Gary and Karlo's mother, Susan's mother-in-law Mara's grandmother and Clara's biological grandmother who knows nothing but money. Mistreats Susan, and subsequently Mara, for her lower class background, and favors Alvira. She becomes nicer and changes her ways after realizing Mara's kind nature, and learning of her older son's toxic actions and behavior.
Ping Medina as Karlo David† – Gary's younger brother, Lupe's youngest son, Susan's brother-in-law, and Mara's biological uncle. He’s responsible for switching Mara and Clara at birth. He remains caring to Mara despite his crime to both her and Clara. Dies before the truth is revealed to everyone aside from his brother and Clara, but his diary documenting the incident is recovered by Susan.
Desiree del Valle as Christina Borres† – Employee in Amanthe's company. She is revealed to be his mistress and was killed by Gary before she tried to look for Amanthe.
Diego Loyzaga as Derrick Gonzales - Mara's second love interest, who was adopted by Mayor Nathaniel Gonzales after his biological father is imprisoned and Carlotta's adoptive brother.

Supporting cast 
Chokoleit† as CG – Susan's friend and Mara (and Clara)'s godparent.
Tiya Pusit† as Yaya Vonnel – Clara (and Mara)'s nanny. She has taken care of Clara throughout the latter's childhood while the parents have been busy with their businesses. Her name is a pun on April Boy Regino's song "Ye Ye Vonnel".
Jamilla Obispo as Lenita Santos† – Gary's evil mistress who supports his crimes. She died after saving Mara from a bomb explosion.
Paolo Serrano as Fidel - Gary's friend
 Dido dela Paz as Abdul Dominador† / Lover Boy† - Owner of the casino who mistreats Lenita. He died after getting shot by Lenita.
Cherry Lou as Vanessa Torralba – Christian's mother who does not like Mara and favors Clara.
Jan Marini Alano as Virginia/Barang
Kiray Celis as Desiree Francisco – She is Clara's evil partner in crime, who also hates Mara and her friends due to Mara being raised poor. Together with Clara they make Mara's life miserable as hell.
EJ Jallorina as Butch Mauricio – Mara's friend.
Aria Clemente as Christina "Jin Jin" Angeles – Mara's friend.
Vangie Martelle as Abby – Clara's friend.
Arie Reyes as Kaye – Clara's friend.
Phytos Ramirez as Miguel "Migs" Soriano – Christian's basketball teammate.
Solo Kiggins as Anthony Mercado – Christian's basketball teammate.
Marion Gopez as Mickey Torres – Christian's basketball teammate.
Renzo Cruz as Mayor Nathaniel Gonzales† – Carlotta's biological father and Derrick's adoptive father who died after getting killed by one of Gary's henchmen.
Helga Krapf as Carlotta Gonzales
Francis Magundayao as young Gary
Izzy Canillo as young Karlo
Andre Tiangco as Atty. Barrameda

Special appearances
Kimberly Fulgar as young Mara David
Christine Joy de Guzman as young Clara De Valle

Cameo
Arron Villaflor
Robi Domingo
Enrique Gil
Jake Cuenca
Jason Abalos
Ejay Falcon
Enchong Dee
Joseph Marco
Joem Bascon
Martin del Rosario
Matteo Guidicelli
Sam Concepcion
Sam Milby
Xian Lim
Zaijian Jaranilla

Reception

International Broadcast 
Mara Clara had a successful run in Kenya, airing on NTV - one of the nation's top three television stations - during the 6pm to 7pm primetime slot. It premiered at the beginning of 2012, succeeding Magkaribal (broadcast as Rivals) and concluded in June. Due to its success, reruns were broadcast after the 9pm primetime news later in the year.

See also
List of shows previously aired by ABS-CBN
List of drama series of ABS-CBN

References

External links

2010 Philippine television series debuts
2011 Philippine television series endings
ABS-CBN drama series
Filipino-language television shows
Television series about teenagers
Television series by Dreamscape Entertainment Television
Television series reboots
Television shows set in the Philippines